This is a list of active and upcoming Marvel Comics printed comic books (as opposed to digital comics, trade paperbacks, hardcover books, etc.). The list is updated as of February 27, 2023.

Ongoing series

Active

Key
  Series ending in March 2023.
  Series ending in April 2023.

Upcoming

Limited series

Active

Upcoming

See also
List of current DC Comics publications
Fresh Start (comics)

References

External links
Marvel Comics

Marvel Comics
Lists of comics by Marvel Comics
Marvel Comics-related lists